Marion Bartoli was the defending champion, but lost to Victoria Azarenka in the quarterfinals.

Azarenka went on to win the title, defeating Maria Sharapova in the final 6–4, 6–1.

Seeds
The top two seeds receive a bye into the second round.

Main draw

Finals

Top half

Bottom half

External links
 WTA tournament info and draws

Silicon Valley Classic
Bank of the West Classic - Singles
Bank of the West Classic - Singles